Yorktown is an unincorporated community in Bureau County, Illinois, United States. Yorktown is located on Illinois Route 92, southwest of Tampico.

References

Unincorporated communities in Bureau County, Illinois
Unincorporated communities in Illinois